Nelson Mandela High School is a high school based in Waterloo, in the Western Area Rural District, Sierra Leone. The school was established in 2007. Notwithstanding that this is a private school, many of the pupils are from very poor backgrounds.

Pupils from the UK visit the school 
In February 2014, led by Mr John Power, six pupils from Merchant Taylors' Girls' School visited Nelson Mandela High School. The week-long visit saw the opening of a new 3-room classroom block at the school, paid for by pupils at Merchant Taylors' Girls' School. As a mark of thanks for the work that Mr John Power had done for the York Road community in Waterloo, Sierra Leone, he was crowned Chief Kombrbai II.

Exchange programme
Nelson Mandela High is partnered through the British Council's Connecting Classrooms Programme with Merchant Taylors' Girls' School in Crosby, Merseyside, England. Since 2010, the schools have participated in exchange visits. The partnership has enabled Nelson Mandela High to become a 'Sustainable School'.

A fresh start 
Mr George Sandi became the new school principal in late 2012. Since then the school has strengthened its partnership with Merchant Taylors' Girls' School in Liverpool. Visits have taken place to the UK and to Sierra Leone to exchange teaching resources and ideas. In June 2013, Merchant Taylors' Girls' School agreed to fund the building of a new 3-block classroom building on the present school site.

References

External links
 British Council Connecting Classrooms

Western Area
Girls' schools in Sierra Leone
Private schools in Sierra Leone
Secondary schools in Sierra Leone
2007 establishments in Sierra Leone
Educational institutions established in 2007